Salimbeni is an Italian surname. People with this name include:
Lorenzo and Jacopo Salimbeni (1374–c.1418 and 1370s–after 1426), Italian painters and brothers
Lorenzo d'Alessandro da Sanseverino (c.1455 – 1503), also called Salimbeni, painter
Ventura Salimbeni (1568 – 1613), painter and printmaker 
Felice Salimbeni (1712 – 1751), Italian soprano castrato

It may also refer to:
The Salimbeni Prize, awarded for writings in art history

See also
Salimbene di Adam

Italian-language surnames